The Jim Henson Company (formerly known as Muppets, Inc., Henson Associates, Inc., and Jim Henson Productions, Inc.; commonly referred to as Henson) is an American entertainment company located in Los Angeles, California. The company is known for its innovations in the field of puppetry, particularly through the creation of Kermit the Frog and the Muppets characters.

Brian Henson serves as chairman, while Lisa Henson serves as CEO. Since 2000, The Jim Henson Company is headquartered at the Jim Henson Company Lot, the historic former Charlie Chaplin Studios, in Hollywood.

The company was established in November 1958 by puppeteers Jim and Jane Henson, and is currently independently owned and operated by their children. Henson has produced many successful television series, including The Muppet Show (1976–1981), Fraggle Rock (1983–1987), and Bear in the Big Blue House (1997–2006); as well, the company designed the Muppet characters for Sesame Street (1969–present).

The company has also produced theatrical films, including The Muppet Movie (1979), The Dark Crystal (1982) and Labyrinth (1986). Henson also operates Jim Henson's Creature Shop, an animatronics and visual effects studio which has created characters and effects for both Henson productions and outside projects. In 1989, the company entered merger negotiations with The Walt Disney Company, which were canceled following Jim Henson's death in 1990.

Subsequently, control of the company was assumed by Henson's children: Lisa, Cheryl, Brian, John, and Heather. In 2000, Henson was sold to German media company EM.TV & Merchandising AG; by the end of that year, however, EM.TV's stock collapsed, and the Henson family re-acquired the company in 2003.

In the interim, EM.TV sold the rights to the Sesame Street Muppets to Sesame Workshop in early January 2001, following a December 2000 announcement. Henson sold The Muppets and Bear in the Big Blue House properties to Disney in 2004, but retains the remainder of its program library and assets.

, Brian, Lisa, Cheryl, and Heather Henson maintain control of the company. Jane Henson died in April 2013, and  John Henson died in February 2014.

History

1958 to 1990
Jim and Jane Henson officially founded Muppets, Inc. on November 20, 1958, three years after Sam and Friends debuted on WRC-TV in Washington, D.C. Aside from Sam and Friends, the majority of its work until 1969 was in advertising; appearances on late-night talk shows; and short "meeting films" primarily for enterprise use, produced from 1965 to 1996. In 1968, the company began designing characters and producing short films for the fledgling Sesame Street, which premiered on NET (succeeded by PBS) in November 1969.

One of the company's first characters to appear regularly on television, Rowlf the Dog, originated in commercials for Purina Dog Chow and became a regular character on The Jimmy Dean Show from 1963 to 1966. During this time, the show's host, Jimmy Dean, refused an opportunity to own 40% of the company, assuming that he did not attain that right. Jim Henson also pitched several different projects to the major American television networks, to little avail. Some ideas became unaired pilots, while others were never produced.

In 1976, producer Lew Grade approached Henson to produce a weekly series in Grade's native United Kingdom. This series became The Muppet Show, produced by Associated Television (ATV) for the ITV network. The success of The Muppet Show led to the Muppets becoming an enduring media franchise. Another company controlled by Grade, ITC Entertainment, originally owned The Muppet Show, among other Henson productions, but Henson acquired the rights to these productions in the 1980s. During this time, Henson formed Jim Henson's Creature Shop, a special effects studio partially responsible for the films The Dark Crystal and Labyrinth; and television series The StoryTeller, Farscape, and Dinosaurs.

Later in his life, Henson produced Fraggle Rock and The Jim Henson Hour. In August 1989, Henson and Disney CEO Michael Eisner began merger discussions reportedly valued at $150 million, which also included a fifteen-year contract for Henson's personal "creative services." However, the deal did not include the rights to the Sesame Street characters, which were owned by Henson, although merchandising revenue was split between Henson and the Children's Television Workshop.

Also during the negotiations, management of the company's Henson International Television distribution unit based in the UK purchased their unit from the company, leading to the establishment of HIT Entertainment. On May 16, 1990, as negotiations continued, Jim Henson died of toxic shock syndrome. Following Henson's death, neither Disney nor Jim Henson Productions could come to an accord. Negotiations officially ended in December 1990, and Henson remained an independent company.

1991 to 1999
The Henson family assumed management of the company, and Brian Henson was named president, chairman, and CEO in January 1991. In the following years, Henson entered into deals with several companies, including television rights to the Henson library with Disney Channel and Nickelodeon; a record label with BMG Kidz; and a home media label with Buena Vista Home Video. In 1995, Henson entered into an agreement with ABC to produce primetime television series, leading to Muppets Tonight and Aliens in the Family.

Following the releases of The Muppet Christmas Carol and Muppet Treasure Island by Walt Disney Pictures, Henson formed Jim Henson Pictures with Sony Pictures Entertainment. In 1998, the company signed a deal with Columbia TriStar Home Video to launch Jim Henson Home Entertainment. By 1999, Henson held partial interests in two cable channels: The Kermit Channel (broadcasting in Asia) and Odyssey Network (broadcasting in the United States), both jointly owned with Hallmark Entertainment. After Hallmark (through Crown Media Holdings) assumed full ownership of these networks, the Kermit Channel was discontinued and Odyssey was renamed the Hallmark Channel.

2000 to 2004

In 2000, the Henson family sold the company to the German media company EM.TV & Merchandising AG, for $680 million. That summer, EM.TV sold Henson's stakes in the Odyssey and Kermit cable channels in exchange for an 8.2% stake in Hallmark-controlled Crown Media Holdings. By the end of 2000, after EM.TV subsequently experienced major financial problems, EM.TV sold the company's ownership of the Sesame Street Muppets and Henson's small interest in the Noggin television network to Sesame Workshop, and by early 2001, Henson itself was marked for sale. The Walt Disney Company, Viacom, HIT Entertainment, Aol Time Warner, Saban Entertainment, Classic Media, as well as Henson management, among others, were all parties reportedly interested in acquiring the company.

In December 2002, a deal was announced in which EM.TV would sell a 49.9% stake in Henson to an investment group led by Dean Valentine, a former executive at Disney and UPN. However, in March 2003, the deal was canceled, citing financial issues on Valentine's part. In May 2003, EM.TV was reportedly nearing an agreement to sell Henson to a consortium between Classic Media and Sesame Workshop (with financing from Sony Pictures Entertainment), until the Henson family re-acquired the company for a closing price of $84 million.

In February 2004, Henson sold the Muppets and Bear in the Big Blue House to The Walt Disney Company, who subsequently formed The Muppets Studio (known at that time as The Muppets Holding Company). The term "Muppet", likewise, became a legal trademark of Disney; Sesame Workshop retains permission to use the term for its Sesame Street characters under a license from Disney.

2004 to present
On April 1, 2004, Henson and HIT Entertainment agreed to a five-year global distribution and production deal which included distribution of 440 hours of the company's remaining library including Fraggle Rock, Emmet Otter's Jug-Band Christmas, The Hoobs and Jim Henson's Mother Goose Stories. In addition, the agreement also included the production of new properties, including Frances, in which both companies co-produced and also both co-own the copyright to the series. After that deal expired, Henson entered similar agreements with Lionsgate Home Entertainment and Gaiam Vivendi Entertainment. As well, the company became involved with computer animated projects, including the direct-to-video Unstable Fables series; Sid the Science Kid; Dinosaur Train; and Splash and Bubbles, as well as the puppet series Pajanimals.

Henson later formed Henson Alternative, which specializes in adult content, including the live shows known alternatively as Puppet Improv, Puppet Up!, and Stuffed and Unstrung. In recent years, the Fraggle Rock characters have made several appearances, usually at special events. The characters appeared with Ben Folds Five in the music video for "Do It Anyway"; and in 2013, Gobo and Red Fraggle hosted a Fraggle Rock marathon on the Hub Network.

In 2019, The Dark Crystal: Age of Resistance, a prequel to The Dark Crystal, premiered on Netflix. In 2022, Fraggle Rock: Back to the Rock, a reboot of Fraggle Rock, premiered on Apple TV+.

On August 9, 2022, the company signed a worldwide distribution agreement with Shout! Factory which would allow Shout! to distribute thirteen series and specials from the Henson catalog on home entertainment and streaming platforms across all territories.

Staff

Henson Family
 Jim Henson (1936–1990) – Founder of The Jim Henson Company.
 Jane Henson (1934–2013) – Co-founder of The Jim Henson Company.
 Brian Henson – Chairman of The Jim Henson Company.
 Lisa Henson – CEO of The Jim Henson Company.
 Cheryl Henson – Board of Directors member, President of the Jim Henson Foundation. Formerly a liaison to Sesame Workshop from 1992 to 2000.
 John Henson (1965–2014) – Board of Directors member.
 Heather Henson – Board of Directors member.

Leadership
 Peter Schube – President and COO of The Jim Henson Company.
 Lori Don – Executive Vice President and CFO of The Jim Henson Company.
 Richard Goldsmith – Executive Vice President, Global Distribution, and International Consumer Projects.
 Joe Henderson – Executive Vice President, Worldwide Administration.
 Stephanie Schroeder – Executive Vice President, Business Affairs & Legal.
 Halle Stanford – Executive Vice President of Children's Entertainment.
 Nicole Goldman – Senior Vice President, Marketing and Publicity.
 Karen Lee Arbeeny – Vice President, Business Operations, Global Distribution.
 Faryal Ganjehei – Vice President and Studio Operations at the Henson Recording Studio.
 Anna Jordan Douglass – Vice President, Digital Development & Interactive Media.
 Howard Sharp – Vice President of Administration.
 Peter Brooke – Creative Supervisor at Jim Henson's Creature Shop.
 Jerry Houle - Vice President of Marketing 1977-1984

Other staff members
 Karen Falk – Historian and archivist.

Filmography

Films
{| class="wikitable plainrowheaders" style="width: 100%;"
|-
! scope="col" | Production company
! scope="col" | Title
! scope="col" | Release date
! scope="col" | Production partners
! scope="col" | Distributor
|-
! scope="row" rowspan="2" | Muppets Inc.
| Time Piece
| 
| 
| Pathé Contemporary Films
|-
| The Cube
| 
| 
| NBC
|-
! scope="row" rowspan="6" | Henson Associates
| The Muppet Movie
| 
| rowspan=3 | ITC Entertainment
| Associated Film Distribution
|-
| The Great Muppet Caper
| 
| Universal Pictures
|-
| The Dark Crystal
| 
| Universal Pictures
|-
| The Muppets Take Manhattan
| 
| 
| TriStar Pictures
|-
| Sesame Street Presents: Follow That Bird
| 
| Children's Television Workshop
| Warner Bros.
|-
| Labyrinth
| 
| Lucasfilm
| TriStar Pictures
|-
! scope="row" rowspan="5" | Jim Henson Productions
| The Witches
| 
| Lorimar Film Entertainment
| Warner Bros.
|-
| Jim Henson's Muppet*Vision 3D
| 
|
| Disney-MGM StudiosWalt Disney Attractions
|-
| The Muppet Christmas Carol| 
| Walt Disney Pictures
| Buena Vista Pictures Distribution
|-
| Gulliver's Travels| 
| Hallmark Entertainment
| NBC
|-
| Muppet Treasure Island| 
| Walt Disney Pictures
| Buena Vista Pictures Distribution
|-
! scope="row" rowspan="7" | Jim Henson Pictures
| Buddy| 
| 
| rowspan="3" | Sony Pictures Releasing
|-
| Muppets from Space| 
| Columbia Pictures
|-
| The Adventures of Elmo in Grouchland| 
| 
|-
| Rat|  (UK)
| 
|
|-
| Jack and the Beanstalk: The Real Story| 
| Hallmark Entertainment
|
|-
| It's a Very Merry Muppet Christmas Movie| 
| 
| Universal Pictures
|-
| Good Boy!| 
| 
|
|-
! rowspan="18" scope="row" | The Jim Henson Company
| Five Children and It| 
| 
| Capitol Films
|-
| Farscape: The Peacekeeper Wars| 
| Hallmark Entertainment
|
|-
| The Muppets' Wizard of Oz| 
| 
| Walt Disney Television
|-
| MirrorMask| 
| Destination Films
| 
|-
| Unstable Fables: 3 Pigs and a Baby| 
| rowspan="3" | 
| rowspan="3" | Genius Products
|-
| Unstable Fables: Tortoise vs. Hare| 
|-
| Unstable Fables: The Goldilocks and the 3 Bears Show| 
|-
| Sid the Science Kid: The Movie| 
| 
| PBSNCircle Entertainment
|-
| Alexander and the Terrible, Horrible, No Good, Very Bad Day| 
| 
| Walt Disney Studios Motion Pictures
|-
| Lily the Unicorn| 
| 
| Amazon Prime Video
|-
| Turkey Hollow| 
| 
| Lifetime
|-
| The Star| 
| 
| Sony Pictures Releasing
|-
| Dinosaur Train: Adventure Island| 
| 
| PBSUniversal Pictures
|-
| Guillermo del Toro's Pinocchio| 
| 
| 
|-
|The Portable Door|April 7, 2023
|Story Bridge Films
|
|-
| Untitled Labyrinth spin-off sequel
| rowspan="3"| TBA
| 
| rowspan="2"| 
|-
| Muppet Man| 

|-
|}

Television

From 1969 to 2000, Henson was contracted to design and create Muppet characters for Sesame Street. With the exception of occasional appearances in the Muppets franchise, the characters were used exclusively for Sesame Street, but Henson legally owned these characters prior to their acquisition by Sesame Workshop. The only exception was Kermit the Frog, who was featured in other projects prior to Sesame Street. Sesame Workshop retains the rights to use any Sesame Street footage featuring the character.

The sale ended any direct affiliation between The Muppets and Sesame Street, although the series retains use of the term "Muppet" under license from Disney. Many of the puppeteers continue to perform with both The Muppets and Sesame Street franchises. While no longer owning the Sesame Street characters, Henson continues to design them. This list excludes pre-2001 Sesame Street co-productions outside the United States.

TV series

As a contributor
 Sesame Street (Seasons 1-31) (1969–2000)
 Saturday Night Live (Season 1)
 "The Land of Gorch" segments (1975-1976)
 Wimzie's House (1995–96)
 The High Fructose Adventures of Annoying Orange (2012–2014)

TV specials
 The Great Santa Claus Switch (1970)
 The Frog Prince (1971)
 The Muppet Musicians of Bremen (1972)
 Out to Lunch (1974)
 Emmet Otter's Jug-Band Christmas (1977)
 John Denver & the Muppets (1979)
 Rocky Mountain Holiday (1983)
 The Muppets: A Celebration of 30 Years (1986)
 The Tale of the Bunny Picnic (1986)
 The Christmas Toy (1986)
 A Muppet Family Christmas (1987)
 Sesame Street... 20 Years & Still Counting (1989)
 The Jim Henson Hour (1989):
 Miss Piggy's Hollywood (1989)
 Secrets of the Muppets (1992)
 The Muppets at Walt Disney World (1990)
 The Muppets Celebrate Jim Henson (1990)
 Mr. Willowby's Christmas Tree (1995)

Direct-to-video
 Jim Henson Play-Along Video (1988)
 Hey, You're As Funny as Fozzie Bear: A Comedy Show Starring Fozzie Bear and You
 Sing-Along, Dance-Along, Do-Along: Rowlf teaches kids about music.
 Wow, You're a Cartoonist!
 Neat Stuff... To Know and Do
 Jim Henson's Mother Goose Stories (1987–1990)
 Peek-A-Boo, A Big Surprise for Little People
 Muppet Sing Alongs
 Billy Bunny's Animal Songs (1993)
 "It's Not Easy Being Green"
 "Muppet Treasure Island Sing Alongs"
 "Things That Fly"
 Muppet Classic Theater (1994)
 "Jim Henson's Preschool Collection"
 "Muppets on Wheels" (1995)
 "Yes, I Can Learn" (1995)
 "Yes, I Can Help" (1995)
 Kermit's Swamp Years (2002)

Web content
 The Skrumps (2007)
 The Sam Plenty Cavalcade of Action Show Plus Singing! (2008)

Henson Alternative
The following list contains projects of The Jim Henson Company under its Henson Alternative banner.

Movies

Television series
The first eight series are produced under its Henson Alternative banner exclusively in North America before premiering worldwide in 2015.
 Tinseltown (2007)
 Alt/Reality (2010-2011)
 Simian Undercover Detective Squad (2012)
 Late Night Buffet with Augie and Del (2006)
 Del's Vegas Comedy Binge (2007)
 Late Night Liars (2010)
 Marvin E. Quasniki for President (2011–12)
 Neil's Puppet Dreams (2012–13)
 Ketchup with the Hot Dogs (2013–14)
 Good Morning Today (2013–14)
 No, You Shut Up! (2013–2016)
 The Curious Creations of Christine McConnell (2018)

Stage shows
 Puppet Up! - Uncensored (2006–present)
 Stuffed and Unstrung (2010-2013)

Other productions
 The Muppet segments of the Nintendo Digital Event, shown during E3 (2015).
 Star Fox Zero'' commercial (2016).

See also
 Tippett Studio

Notes

References

External links
 

 
Entertainment companies based in California
Companies based in Los Angeles
Entertainment companies established in 1958
1958 establishments in California
The Muppets
American companies established in 1958